The Copa Fraternidad 1976 was the sixth Central American club championship played between 7 clubs.

Teams

Results

Standings

Champion

External links
 

1976
1
1975–76 in Costa Rican football
1975–76 in Salvadoran football
1975–76 in Guatemalan football